The Turbine-class destroyer was a group of eight destroyers built for the  (Royal Italian Navy) in the 1920s. The ships played a minor role in the Spanish Civil War of 1936–1937, supporting the Nationalists. All the ships of the class were lost during World War II.

Design and description
The Turbine-class destroyers were enlarged and improved versions of the preceding  . In an effort to improve their speed, they were lengthened and given more powerful propulsion machinery than the earlier ships. This provided more space for fuel oil which increased their endurance as well.

Their complement was 12 officers and 167 enlisted men.

The Turbines were powered by two Parsons geared steam turbines, each driving one propeller shaft using steam supplied by three Thornycroft boilers.

Their main battery consisted of four  guns in two twin-gun turrets, one each fore and aft of the superstructure. Anti-aircraft (AA) defense for the Turbine-class ships was provided by a pair of  AA guns in single mounts amidships and a twin-gun mount for  machine guns. They were equipped with six  torpedo tubes in two triple mounts amidships. The Turbines could carry 52 mines.

Ships

History 

During the Spanish Civil War, the Italians supported the Spanish Nationalists not only by assisting them with war supplies, but also through undercover operations against enemy shipping. In the course of these missions, the destroyer Ostro torpedoed and sank the Spanish Republican freighter  on 13 August 1937, while Turbine sank the Soviet cargo ship Timiryazev by the same means on 30 August, both of them off the coast of French Algeria.

At the beginning of World War II, when Italy declared war against Britain and France, all eight ships of the Turbine class were based in Tobruk, Libya. They were tasked with mine laying duties and running supplies between Tobruk and Taranto. On 16 June 1940, Turbine sank the British submarine  just off Tobruk.

Turbine, Aquilone and Nembo took part in the shelling of the Egyptian port of Sollum on 14 June 1940. They repeated this action on 26 June.

On 28 June 1940, Espero, Ostro and Zeffiro were in convoy, heavily loaded down with cargo, when they were intercepted by a British task force of five ships. In the ensuing battle,  sank Espero as it lagged behind to allow the other two destroyers to reach Benghasi and later Tobruk safely.

On 5 July 1940, British aircraft carrier  launched an attack on Tobruk harbor. Its Fairey Swordfish torpedo bombers sank  Zeffiro, and severely damaged Euro. Later that month, on 20 July, during another attack on Tobruk harbour, other Swordfish from HMS Eagle sank with torpedoes both Nembo and Ostro. On 17 September of the same year, Swordfish from  attacked Benghazi harbor where Aquilone and Borea were berthed, and both were sunk. Euro was part of the escort of the ill-fated Duisburg convoy, when her commander lost the opportunity of torpedoing the cruiser  due to an error of identification. On 3 July 1942, while escorting three freighters from Taranto to Benghazi along with the  Da Verrazzano, Euro and Turbine shot down two Beaufort bombers.

After Italy signed the Armistice of Cassibile in September 1943, Euro participated in the Battle of Leros where she was sunk by German Junkers Ju 87 "Stuka" dive bombers during an air raid on 3 October 1943. Turbine was seized by the Kriegsmarine and put into service in the Aegean Sea as a torpedo boat. On 19 June 1944, at Porto Lago, she was badly damaged by an explosion, which was thought to have been sabotage. She set in to the port of Salamis for repairs, but a US air strike on the port on 16 September sank her before they could be entirely completed.

Notes

Bibliography

External links 

Uboat.net: Turbine class destroyers
SteelNavy Ship Modeling: Turbine class 

Destroyer classes
 
Military units and formations of the Spanish Civil War
Destroyers of the Regia Marina